Beratsimanana is a town and commune in Madagascar. It belongs to the district of Maevatanana, which is a part of Betsiboka Region. The population of the commune was estimated to be approximately 8,000 in 2001 commune census.

Only primary schooling is available. The majority 80% of the population of the commune are farmers, while an additional 20% receives their livelihood from raising livestock. The most important crops are rice and peanuts, while other important agricultural products are sweet potatoes and tobacco.

References and notes 

Populated places in Betsiboka